Lucien Rinaldo Burleigh Jr. (1853–1923), whose work was often signed L. R. Burleigh, was an artist and lithographer in Troy, New York who drew and published panoramic maps. His business has been identified as Burleigh Lithograph Company or Burleigh Lithograph Establishment. He produced views of approximately 280 locations of which 120 have been established as his while the others include work by other artists.

The Library of Congress has 163 panoramic city plans produced by Burleigh. State and local archives in New York may contain even more of Burleigh's views. He was listed in an 1883 city directory for Troy as a civil engineer and become a lithographer and view publisher by 1886. The period of his greatest productivity of prints continued until 1890.

Burleigh was born in Plainfield, Connecticut. One of his lithographs is in the Smithsonian American Art Museum collection. The Boston Public Library and Library of Congress also have examples of his lithographs in their collections.

Burleigh's drawings were made into lithographs and include the name of each locality in an artistically stylized font as well as a listing of local landmarks. The designs were copyrighted. Some of the lithographs he published from earlier than 1886 and later than 1889 indicate they were published by Burleigh and copyrighted by his business but drawn by someone else.

His grandfather was the principal at Plainfield Academy in Connecticut. Burleigh graduated from Worcester County Free Institute of Industrial Science.

J Lyth
J Lyth was an engraver who worked Burleigh before Burleigh drew and published his own perspective maps of small towns in New York, Massachusetts and other areas in the northeastern United States.

Gallery

Burleigh gallery

See also
 Thaddeus Mortimer Fowler
 Maria Rabinky
 Edwin Whitefield

References

External links 
 

1853 births
1923 deaths
American lithographers
People from Troy, New York